"Coming Home" is a song recorded by New Zealand-born Australian country music artist Keith Urban featuring American singer Julia Michaels, released in March 2018 as the second single from Urban's 2018 album Graffiti U. The artists co-wrote the song with Nicolle Galyon and J.R. Rotem, with Merle Haggard receiving songwriting credits for the sampling of his 1968 single "Mama Tried". Urban and Rotem are also the producers.

Background and composition
Urban told Billboard he enlisted Michaels "to help [him] flesh out a few little bits and pieces, and then she had this cool bridge idea and she sang that, so she ended up on the song. It's a very specific piece, drawing from very different places from Merle to Julia to J.R. to what [he does], all coming together."

The song contains a sample of "Mama Tried" by Merle Haggard. Urban sought approval from Haggard's widow, Theresa, and his son, Ben, for the use of the guitar riff.

Critical reception
Billy Dukes from Taste of Country said it's a "song aimed at the next generation of country music fans."

Commercial performance
As of August 2018, "Coming Home" has sold 113,000 copies in the United States.

Music video
The music video was directed by Andy Hines and premiered on CMT, GAC and Vevo in April 2018.  It was filmed in Los Angeles for over two days, with the main performance with Michaels being at the city's Cowboy Palace Saloon.

Charts

Weekly charts

Year-end charts

Certifications

References

2018 singles
2018 songs
Keith Urban songs
Julia Michaels songs
Male–female vocal duets
Capitol Records Nashville singles
Songs written by J. R. Rotem
Songs written by Julia Michaels
Songs written by Nicolle Galyon
Songs written by Merle Haggard
Song recordings produced by J. R. Rotem
Songs written by Keith Urban